Guelb Moghrein Mine is operated by Mauritanian Copper Mines S.A which is a subsidiary of First Quantum Minerals Ltd in Canada. Guelb Moghrein is located 4km to the west of Akjoujt town in the Inchiri region of Mauritania. Commercial production began in October 2006 and the current estimated mine life is 7 years.

Mining is carried out in a single open pit using hydraulic excavators and mechanical drive haul trucks, approximately 1,800,000 tons of ore are mined every month to produce approximately 15,000 tons of copper concentrate per month at a grade of 23% copper with credits received for gold in the concentrate. In 2015 the Guelb Mine produced 45,001 tons of copper and 64,007 ounces of gold.

The mine has been forced to temporarily suspend operations in 2012 and 2014 due to protests and strikes.

References

2016 establishments in Mauritania
Copper mines in Mauritania
Surface mines in Mauritania